; born April 19, 1972) is a Japanese singer, actress and AV actress who has appeared in mainstream films and adult videos.

Life and career
As a teenager, Ozawa had roles in two 1987 films, the youth action comedy Be-Bop High School: Koko yotaro march and the fantasy Nineteen. She also had a featured role in the 1988 slapstick comedy Yamadamura waltz. As a singer, Ozawa released two J-pop CD albums during these years, Chocolate Candle (Dec. 9, 1987) and Natsuki Dreaming (Aug. 26, 1988). In 1989 Ozawa starred as the magical fairy Paipai in the 26 episode Fuji TV series of that name. Ozawa also starred in the 1995 V-cinema production Zero Woman 2, the second sequel to Miki Sugimoto's 1974 film.

Ozawa was one of the two young stars (along with Naomi Akimoto) of director Toshiki Satō's 1996 lesbian-themed film Atashi wa juice (aka I Am Juice). In 2000, Ozawa had a role in the yakuza zombie movie Junk distributed by Japan Home Video.

After a number of years away from the entertainment industry, Ozawa created a stir when she made her debut as an AV performer in April 2004 with the video Decision for the Alice Japan studio, the AV subsidiary of Japan Home Video. Ozawa made several more featured actress AVs with Alice Japan over the next two years. In 2007 and in 2009, Alice Japan released two videos on their Alice Pink label which collected scenes from Ozawa's previous videos remastered in the new thinner mosaic used to censor the genitals in all Japanese AVs.

Filmography

Mainstream film & TV
Source:
  (March 1987) - Saki
  (August 1987)
  (February 1988) - Reika Ayakoji
 Hana no Asuka-gumi! (1988 TV series) - Miko
  (1989 TV series) - PaiPai
 Zero Woman (1995 aka Zero Woman 2) - Rei
  (July 1996)
 Junk (January 2000)

Adult videos (AV)

Photobooks
Source:
 Natsuki Ozawa, Totteoki Sumairu  March 10, 1988, publisher: Kodansha (non-nude)
 Itsunomanika Seishojo  March 10, 1989, publisher: Wani Books (non-nude)
 Natsuki Ozawa Photobook: Alone ( December 20, 1995, publisher: P-PRESS (nude)

See also
Otocky, video game endorsed by Natsuki Ozawa

References

External links

1972 births
Living people
Actresses from Tokyo
Japanese female idols
Japanese women pop singers
Japanese female adult models
Japanese film actresses
Japanese pornographic film actresses
Japanese television actresses
Actors from Nagano Prefecture
Musicians from Nagano Prefecture
Models from Nagano Prefecture
Singers from Tokyo
20th-century Japanese actresses
20th-century Japanese women singers
20th-century Japanese singers
21st-century Japanese actresses
21st-century Japanese women singers
21st-century Japanese singers